Justin Green may refer to:

 Justin Green (cartoonist) (1945–2022), American cartoonist
 Justin Green (cornerback) (born 1991), American football cornerback
 Justin Green (fullback) (born 1982), American football fullback